McParland may refer to:

In Sports 
Anthony McParland (b. 1982) is a Scottish football player who is currently playing for Livingston.
Davie McParland is a former association football player and manager. 
Ian McParland (b. 1961), Scottish football player and manager
Peter McParland (b. 1934) is a former professional footballer.

Other 
James McParland (1843–1919) was a Pinkerton agent.
Leland McParland (1896–1989), American politician